Cholistani refers to people or products of the Cholistan Desert, Pakistan

In particular, Cholistani may refer to:

Cholistani (cattle)
Cholistani (sheep)